The 2015–16 Evansville Purple Aces women's basketball team represents the University of Evansville during the 2015–16 NCAA Division I men's basketball season. The Purple Aces, led by fifth year head coach Oties Epps, play their home games at the Ford Center and are members of the Missouri Valley Conference. They finished the season 3–28, 1–17 in MVC play to finish in last place. They advanced to the quarterfinals of the Missouri Valley women's tournament where they lost to Drake.

On February 29, 2016, head coach Oties Epps resigned. He finished at Evansville with a five year record of 44–106 and Matt Ruffing is named the interim coach for the remainder of the season and for the 2016–17 season.

Roster

Schedule

|-
!colspan=9 style="background:#5C2F83; color:#FF5100;"| Exhibition

|-
!colspan=9 style="background:#5C2F83; color:#FF5100;"| Non-conference regular season

|-
!colspan=9 style="background:#5C2F83; color:#FF5100;"| Missouri Valley regular season

|-
!colspan=9 style="background:#5C2F83; color:#FF5100;"| Missouri Valley Women's Tournament

See also
2015–16 Evansville Purple Aces men's basketball team

References

Evansville Purple Aces women's basketball seasons
Evansville
2015 in sports in Indiana
2016 in sports in Indiana